Nymphicula christinae is a moth in the family Crambidae. It was described by David John Lawrence Agassiz in 2014. It is found in Australia, where it has been recorded from Queensland.

The wingspan is 12–13 mm. The base of the forewing is brown. The antemedian fascia are pale ochreous, edged with dark ochreous. The medial zone is scattered with brown scales and the costa is suffused with ochreous and brown. The terminal area is orange. The hindwings have a few brownish scales at the base and a white subbasal band. The antemedian fascia are orange and the medial zone is white, scaled with dark brown.

Etymology
The species is named for the daughter of the author.

References

Nymphicula
Moths described in 2014